Randy Thomas (born 15 June 1982) is a Barbadian cricketer. He played in one first-class match for the Barbados cricket team in 2002/03.

See also
 List of Barbadian representative cricketers

References

External links
 

1982 births
Living people
Barbadian cricketers
Barbados cricketers